Pridham Road, labelled Route 154, is a 2-lane collector highway in western Prince County, Prince Edward Island, Canada. It is near the town of Alberton.

The highway runs from Route 152 (Union Road) to Route 12, the Lady Slipper Drive, passing through the communities of Montrose and Central Kildare.

Additional information
Pridham Road is a secondary highway in Prince Edward Island. Other nearby busy secondary highways include Union Road (Route 152), Greenmount Road (Route 153), and DeBlois Road (Route 157). Addresses on Pridham Road receive electric power from the St. Louis/Bloomfield substation. Neither basic cable service nor high speed internet from Aliant Telecom has ever been available on Pridham Road. The entire road has been paved since 1979 with the exception of the easternmost ¼ mile.

Schoolchildren on Pridham Road attend Alberton Elementary School for English classes, and St. Louis Elementary School for French language immersion classes. As for emergency services, Alberton Fire Department services the entirety of the road.

List of roads merging from Route 154
Hardy Road
Route 12
Union Road - Route 152
Birch Grove Road
McMillan Road

See also
Alberton
Tignish
Palmer Road

References 

Prince Edward Island provincial highways
Roads in Prince County, Prince Edward Island